The 2018 CONCACAF Women's Championship was the 10th edition of the CONCACAF Women's Championship (also known as the CONCACAF Women's Gold Cup or the CONCACAF Women's World Cup Qualifying Tournament), the quadrennial international football championship organized by CONCACAF for the women's national teams of the North, Central American and Caribbean region. Eight teams played in the tournament, which took place from 4 to 17 October 2018 in the United States.

The tournament served as the CONCACAF qualifiers to the 2019 FIFA Women's World Cup in France. The top three teams qualified for the World Cup, while the fourth-placed team advanced to a play-off against the third-placed team from the South American confederation, CONMEBOL. It also determined the CONCACAF teams playing at the 2019 Pan American Games women's football tournament in Lima.

The United States were the defending champions of the competition. They successfully defended their title as hosts, winning the final 2–0 against Canada for their 8th CONCACAF Women's Championship title.

This was the last CONCACAF tournament branded as the "Women's Championship". In August 2019, CONCACAF announced a rebranding of the competition as the CONCACAF W Championship.

Qualification

Regional qualification tournaments were held to determine the teams playing in the final tournament.

Qualified teams
The following eight teams qualified for the final tournament. Canada, Mexico, and the United States, as members of the North American Football Union (NAFU), qualified automatically. Two teams from the Central American Football Union (UNCAF) and three teams from the Caribbean Football Union (CFU) qualified from their regional qualifying competitions.

Venues
The venues were announced by CONCACAF on 8 April 2018. Sahlen's Stadium and H-E-B Park hosted the group stage matches, while Toyota Stadium hosted the four matches in the knockout stage.

Draw
The draw for the final tournament was held on 4 September 2018, 10:00 EDT (UTC−4), at the Univision Studios in Miami. The eight teams were drawn into two groups of four teams. They were seeded into four pots. Pot 1 contained the United States, seeded in Group A, and Canada, seeded in Group B. The remaining six teams were allocated to Pots 2–4 based on the CONCACAF Women's Rankings. The two teams from UNCAF could not be drawn into the same group.

Squads

The provisional 35-player roster (4 must be goalkeepers) for each team was announced by CONCACAF on 10 September 2018. The final 20-player roster (2 must be goalkeepers) for each team was announced by CONCACAF on 26 September 2018. After the final 20-player roster was submitted, only injury-related changes would be submitted until 24 hours before each team's first match.

Group stage
The top two teams of each group advance to the semi-finals.
Tiebreakers
Teams are ranked according to points (3 points for a win, 1 point for a draw, 0 points for a loss). The rankings of teams in each group are determined as follows (regulations Article 12.12):

If two or more teams are equal on the basis of the above three criteria, their rankings are determined as follows:

Group A
All times are local, EDT (UTC−4).

Group B
All times are local, CDT (UTC−5).

Knockout stage
In the semi-finals, if the match was level at the end of 90 minutes, no extra time would be played and the match would be decided by a penalty shoot-out. In the third place match and final, if the match was level at the end of 90 minutes, extra time would be played, and if still tied after extra time, the match would be decided by a penalty shoot-out (Regulations Article 12.14).

Bracket
All times are local, CDT (UTC−5).

Semi-finals

Canada and United States qualified for 2019 FIFA Women's World Cup. Panama and Jamaica entered into the third place play-off.

Third place play-off

Jamaica qualified for 2019 FIFA Women's World Cup. Panama entered CONCACAF–CONMEBOL play-off vs. Argentina.

Final

Awards

Individual awards
The following awards were given at the conclusion of the tournament.

Goalscorers

Qualification for international tournaments

Qualified teams for FIFA Women's World Cup
The following three teams from CONCACAF qualified for the 2019 FIFA Women's World Cup. Panama failed to qualify losing out the play-off to 2018 Copa América Femenina third-placed team, Argentina.

1 Bold indicates champions for that year. Italic indicates hosts for that year.

Qualified teams for Pan American Games
The tournament was used to determine the four teams from CONCACAF which would qualify for the 2019 Pan American Games women's football tournament. The top team from each of the three zones, i.e., Caribbean (CFU), Central American (UNCAF), and North American (NAFU), would qualify, with the fourth team to be determined by CONCACAF at a later date. However, both United States and Canada declined to participate to focus on the 2019 FIFA Women's World Cup, so Mexico qualified for the North American berth.

2 Bold indicates champions for that year. Italic indicates hosts for that year.

Controversy
In the 89th minute of the final match, Alex Morgan was offside when she scored the second goal for the USA, but the referee did not invalidate the goal. Video assistant referee was not used in this tournament.

References

External links
World Cup Qualifying – Women, CONCACAF.com

 
2018–19 in CONCACAF football
2019 FIFA Women's World Cup qualification
2018
2018 in women's association football
October 2018 sports events in North America
2018
2018 in American women's soccer
Qualification tournaments for the 2019 Pan American Games
United States at the 2019 FIFA Women's World Cup
Canada at the 2019 FIFA Women's World Cup
Jamaica at the 2019 FIFA Women's World Cup